The 2023 America East Men's Basketball Conference tournament is the postseason men's basketball tournament for the America East Conference. It began on March 4, 2023 and will end on March 11, 2023. All tournament games are being played on the home arenas of the higher-seeded school. The winner, Vermont, received the conference's automatic bid to the 2023 NCAA Tournament.

Seeds 
Eight of the nine America East teams are contesting the tournament. 

Tiebreakers will be applied as needed to determine seeding.

Schedule

Bracket

See also 

 2023 America East women's basketball tournament
 America East Conference men's basketball tournament

References 

America East Conference men's basketball tournament
America East men's basketball tournament
2022–23 America East Conference men's basketball season